Economic Inquiry is a peer-reviewed academic journal published by Wiley-Blackwell on behalf of the Western Economic Association International. The current editor-in-chief is Tim Salmon (Southern Methodist University). The journal was established in 1962 as the Western Economic Journal. It covers research on all aspects of economics. According to the SCImago Journal Rank (SJR), its two-year 2018 impact factor is 1.406, ranking it 145th out of 621 journals in the category "Economics and Econometrics".

References

External links 
 

Wiley-Blackwell academic journals
English-language journals
Quarterly journals
Economics journals
Publications established in 1962
Academic journals associated with learned and professional societies